Fusaichi Pegasus (foaled April 12, 1997) is a champion American Thoroughbred racehorse who won the 2000 Kentucky Derby, and subsequently set a record at auction - selling for US$70M to Coolmore Stud.

Background
The colt was purchased as a yearling for $4 million by Fusao Sekiguchi. His name is a combination of his owner's name, "Fusao," and the Japanese word for one, "ichi," to mean #1 or the best. The second half is the winged horse of Greek mythology.

"FuPeg", as the stallion is known by his fans, is a son of Mr. Prospector and out of Angel Fever, a mare by leading sire Danzig.

Racing career
In early 2000, Fusaichi Pegasus won the Grade 2 San Felipe Stakes and Wood Memorial Stakes.

Fusaichi Pegasus won the Kentucky Derby in a time of 2:01.12 for the 1 mile distance. He was the first favorite to win the Kentucky Derby since Spectacular Bid in 1979. He then lost to Red Bullet in the Preakness Stakes. After his loss in the Preakness Stakes, he did not race in the third leg of the Triple Crown, the Belmont Stakes.

Retirement and stud record
In 2000, he was sold to Irish breeder Coolmore Stud for a reported price of more than US$70 million (£35m). The previous record for a stallion prospect was US$40m (£24m), paid in 1983 for Shareef Dancer. For several years, Fusaichi Pegasus served as a "shuttle stallion" standing at Coolmore's Ashford Stud near Versailles, Kentucky, during the Northern Hemisphere breeding season and at Coolmore Australia near Jerrys Plains, New South Wales, during the Southern Hemisphere breeding season. Since the 2010 breeding season, he has stood exclusively in Kentucky. Among his progeny are Grade 1 winners Bandini,  Roman Ruler and Haradasun.

His son  Roman Ruler produced Ruler on Ice, winner of the 2011 Belmont Stakes.  He was pensioned from stud duty after the 2020 breeding season.

Pedigree

References

1997 racehorse births
Racehorses bred in Kentucky
Racehorses trained in the United States
Kentucky Derby winners
Horse monuments
Thoroughbred family 8-c